The G Word with Adam Conover is a 2022 American documentary comedy show on Netflix created by Adam Conover. The show discusses topics and their connection to the federal government of the United States, with "the g word" referring to 'government.' The show is produced by Barack Obama, the 44th president of the United States, and his wife, Michelle Obama. Each episode examines a different aspect of the government, loosely based on the book The Fifth Risk by Michael Lewis.

Writing for the show had started a week before COVID-19 lockdowns, before being moved online.

Episodes

Reception 

On review aggregator Rotten Tomatoes, The G Word has an approval rating of 100% based on 5 reviews. Melissa Camacho wrote for Common Sense Media that "There's a lot to be learned here, and it's a lot more entertaining than your average civics class." Nell Minow wrote in RogerEbert.com that "If we don’t believe in government, it dies. We cannot believe in it if we do not understand it, and The G Word's depictions of the best and worst of government are a welcome first step." Some critics questioned the show's association with Barack and Michelle Obama: Sonia Rao of The Washington Post wrote in an article titled 'Why it’s hard to trust an Obama-produced show to critique the government', that 'The G Word' was characterized by a, "...somewhat disingenuous take on what is required for the government to truly serve its people — perhaps the most obvious indicator of its producers’ bias." Libertarian political pundit John Stossel criticized the show, writing in Reason that the show was "...big government propaganda..." and that "...it sneers at what it calls this philosophy that the free market should be trusted over the government."

References

External links 
 
 

2020s American documentary television series
2020s American comedy television series
2022 American television series debuts
Netflix original documentary television series
English-language Netflix original programming
Television series by A24
Television series by Higher Ground Productions